Dokdo Museum is the name used for two museums in Korea that relate to the Liancourt Rocks, known as Dokdo in Korean. One of the museums is located on Ulleungdo and the other, which opened later, is in Seoul.

Ulleung-gun

The Dokdo Museum on Ulleung is government run and is underwritten by Samsung. The museum was built in the shape of Sambongdo (literally "Three Peaks Island," Liancourt Rocks' name in the Joseon Dynasty). The first curator, Lee Jong-Hak, had collected many materials from all over the world. Dokdo Museum was also founded with help from Hong Sun-Chil, who was the leader of the Volunteer Guard of Dokdo. It is the only museum about territory in Korea.

The museum at Ulleungdo opened in 1995 or 1997 with a mission of collecting and researching the Rocks and the Sea of Japan. Korea aims to use this exhibit as a means of strengthening its claim over the rocks.

Seoul
The Seoul Museum, operated by the Northeast Asian History Foundation opened in 2012.
The museum, which has a collection of maps and other documents, focuses on education and virtual experiences and  forms part of what has come to be called Dokdo-ganda, propaganda as to the ownership of these islands.

See also
Voluntary Agency Network of Korea

References

External links
Dokdo Museum Ulleungdo
Dokdo Museum Seoul

Museums in South Korea
Museums established in 1997